The 1983 Brazilian Grand Prix was a Formula One motor race held at Jacarepaguá on 13 March 1983. It was the first round of the 1983 Formula One season.

Qualifying 
Andrea de Cesaris was excluded after failing to stop for a weight check during Saturday qualifying.

It was also the last pole position for Cosworth until .

Race 
Elio de Angelis qualified for the race in his Renault turbo-powered Lotus 93T, but switched to the team's spare car, a Cosworth DFV-powered Lotus 92, when the Renault unit failed on the warm-up lap. This was deemed illegal and so he was disqualified.

Rosberg was disqualified for a push start in the pits, after his car momentarily caught fire during refueling. It was the second consecutive Brazilian Grand Prix in which Rosberg was disqualified from second place. Curiously, the drivers finishing behind him were not promoted, so the six points for second place were officially not awarded.

Classification

Qualifying 

† — time disallowed, driver excluded.

Race

Championship standings after the race

Drivers' Championship standings

Constructors' Championship standings

Note: Only the top five positions are included for both sets of standings.

References

Brazilian Grand Prix
Brazilian Grand Prix
Grand Prix
Brazilian Grand Prix